Ernie Myers is an American former basketball player. Myers is originally from East Harlem, New York.  Myers went to high school in New York at Tolentine High School.
He was recruited by Jim Valvano as a sophomore in high school, while he was playing against Rice High School (Manhattan, New York).

North Carolina State
Myers was the ACC freethrow champion.  During this time he also played at Riverside Church. For a time, he led North Carolina State in scoring. In 1983, he was a true Freshman. He was part of the team that went 26-10. He teamed with Cozell McQueen, Terry Gannon, and Alving Battle to lead North Carolina State to the National Championships in 1983.

Personal life
He has two children, Ernest and Emerson.

References

 

Living people
American men's basketball players
Basketball players from New York City
McDonald's High School All-Americans
NC State Wolfpack men's basketball players
Parade High School All-Americans (boys' basketball)
People from East Harlem
Year of birth missing (living people)